Job Kuijt (born 1930), is a Canadian botanist, with particular interest in  Viscaceae, Loranthaceae and Eremolepidaceae.
He is professor at the University of Victoria on Vancouver Island of British Columbia. He was awarded a Guggenheim fellowship in 1964. He was awarded the George Lawson Medal in 1971 by the Canadian Botanical Association.

Names published 
(incomplete list: query lists some 645 names-some repeated)
 Antidaphne andina Kuijt—Fl. Ecuador 24(32A): 7. 1986
 Antidaphne antidaphnoides (Rizzini) Kuijt—Syst. Bot. Monogr. 18: 26. 1988 
 Antidaphne glaziovii (Tiegh.) Kuijt—Syst. Bot. Monogr. 18: 26. 1988 
 Antidaphne hondurensis Kuijt—Novon 8: 402, fig. 1-6. 1998 
 Aetanthus dichotomus (Ruiz & Pav.) Kuijt—Fl. Ecuador 24: 167. 1986
 Aetanthus macranthus (Hook.) Kuijt—Fl. Ecuador 24(32C): 169. 1986 
 Aetanthus megaphyllus Kuijt—Pl. Diversity Evol. 131(1-3): 20. 2014 
 Aetanthus pascoensis Kuijt—Pl. Diversity Evol. 131(1-3): 33. 2014 
 Aetanthus prolongatus Kuijt—Pl. Diversity Evol. 131(1-3): 36. 2014 
 Aetanthus sessilifolius Kuijt—Pl. Diversity Evol. 131(1-3): 38. 2014 
 Aetanthus tachirensis Kuijt—Pl. Diversity Evol. 131(1-3): 40. 2014
Phoradendron nickrentianum Kuijt, Novon 21(4): 456 (2011).

(These may not be accepted names.)

References

20th-century Canadian botanists
Living people
1930 births
21st-century Canadian botanists